Villedieu is a commune in the Vaucluse department in the Provence-Alpes-Côte d'Azur region in southeastern France.

A local legend says that the penitents asked to Alice Colonieu to make a statue of the Virgin and to install on the back of a house in Villedieu. This set of Renaissance style, decorated with a king scallop is called the " Virgin of the Smile" and is still visible in Villedieu.

See also
Communes of the Vaucluse department

References

Communes of Vaucluse